Gregory Norton Harris (born 1965) is a retired United States Navy rear admiral who last served as the Director of Air Warfare of the United States Navy from August 23, 2019 to June 2021. Previously, he served as the Chief of Naval Air Training from July 12, 2018, to July 26, 2019.

Raised in Yarmouth, Maine, Harris is a 1987 graduate of the United States Naval Academy. Originally designated a naval flight officer in May 1989, he became a naval aviator in May 1993. Harris logged over 4,300 flight hours and 1,045 arrested landings. He has flown over 100 combat missions in support of Operations Desert Shield, Desert Storm, Southern Watch, Enduring Freedom, Iraqi Freedom and Inherent Resolve.

References

|-

|-

1965 births
Living people
Place of birth missing (living people)
People from Yarmouth, Maine
United States Naval Academy alumni
United States Naval Flight Officers
United States Navy personnel of the Gulf War
Recipients of the Air Medal
United States Naval Aviators
Recipients of the Legion of Merit
United States Navy admirals